The Lopatna (also: Lopanta) is a right tributary of the river Matița in Romania. It discharges into the Matița in the village Matița. It flows through the villages Cărbunești, Surani, Șoimari, Măgura and Matița.

References

Rivers of Romania
Rivers of Prahova County